Denkendorf is a municipality in the district of Eichstätt in Bavaria in Germany.

Mayors
since 2013: Claudia Forster (CSU/Christliche Wähler)
 2008-2012: Jürgen Hauke (Christliche Wähler)
 1996–2008: Josef Bienek (Freie Wähler-Free voters)
 1978–1996: Alfons Weber
 1964–1978: Michael Heggenberger

References

Eichstätt (district)